The eastern bent-wing bat, (Miniopterus fuliginosus) is a species of vesper bat in the family Minopteridae. It is found in South Asia, Far-east Asia, the east Caucasus Mountains and also in Southeast Asian regions.

Description
They exhibit long and narrow wings, high wingspans and low wing loadings, which enable quick and long flights.

Color varies from reddish brown to dark blackish brown above, with the underparts being lighter. The wing membrane is blackish brown. Fur is dense and soft, long above and short below. The ears are small and the cheeks are hairless below the eyes.

Taxonomy
This species was once considered a subspecies of the common bent-wing bat, but now it has been accepted that the eastern bent-winged bat and Australasian bent-winged bat are two separate species.

References

Mammals of Sri Lanka
Mammals of India
Miniopteridae
Mammals described in 1835
Bats of Asia